Ted Grossman (born 1942) is an American radio personality. Since 1977, he has hosted the weekly jazz and Big band music program Night Train on WLRN-FM in Miami, Florida, one of the longest-running radio programs still broadcast throughout South Florida.

Early life 
Theodore Grossman was born in the Brooklyn borough of New York City in 1942. He graduated from North Miami High School in North Miami, Florida, in 1960 and was a speech major at Dade Junior College (now Miami-Dade College).

One of his earliest jobs for which he was paid for his speaking skills was in 1967 when he announced the dolphin shows at the Miami Seaquarium for $90 a week. Later, he worked as a parts manager for an appliance store. Eventually, he became a postal employee, driving over  a day carrying special delivery letters for the U.S. Postal Service.

"The first live jazz I saw," Grossman told the Miami Herald in 1983, "was when my father and a friend of his took me to the Sir John Hotel in Miami, about 1962. [Count] Basie's doing an afternoon concert, three bucks. It was 'April in Paris' they played, and Sonny Payne, the drummer, got the solo. The band got up and walked off, had a drink, while Payne put on a wild show, throwing up his sticks and all. He did ten minutes, then the guys came back and finished it off with a bang. I don't care what kind of music you like, you see that, it knocks you out."

Career 
While still a mail carrier, Grossman approached public radio station WLRN in 1975 when the station expanded its jazz programming. He volunteered his talents. As Grossman recounted to the Miami Herald in 1983, "You don't have any big-band show, I told them. They let me on to sink or swim."

Night Train

Grossman's program, Night Train, premiered on WLRN in January 1977. He has served as its sole regular host since its debut.  In the late 1970s, it was a three-hour show that aired on Friday nights. In the 1980s, it moved to Sunday nights and expanded to four hours. Today, it is simulcast live to the Florida Keys on WLRN's affiliate, WKWM.

In addition to playing the recordings on his show, Grossman supplies anecdotes and authoritative commentary about the bands and performers, including album notes and assorted trivia. He often peppers his show with mentions of the birthdays, deaths, or other anniversaries of jazz notables, past and present.

Occasionally, the show will feature local or nationally known recording artists or other musicians as in-studio guests, with Grossman playing recordings and quizzing his guest about the identity of the recording's performer(s) or vocalist(s).

In keeping with the show's locomotive-themed title, Grossman is known for donning a train conductor's striped railroad hat as he broadcasts each week.  The Miami Herald once described Night Train as a "rambling, rumbling three-hour local service with stops at Big Band, Dixieland, The Blues and Crooner City."

References

External links 

 Night Train webpage at WLRN-FM
 Ted Grossman webpage at WLRN-FM
 Brief excerpt of Ted Grossman on-air during a Night Train broadcast (by Paul Leary)

1942 births
Living people
Radio personalities from New York City
People from Miami-Dade County, Florida
People from Brooklyn
Radio personalities from Miami
Jazz radio presenters
American radio DJs
People from North Miami, Florida